Provincial Trunk Highway 24 (PTH 24) is a provincial highway in the Canadian province of Manitoba.  It is an east–west route that runs from PTH 83 near Miniota, east through Oak River and Rapid City to the junction of PTH 10 and PR 262 between Brandon and Minnedosa.

History
The original PTH 24 went from PTH 22 (redesignated as PTH 83 in 1953) near Melita to the Saskatchewan boundary near Gainsborough. In 1949, this became part of PTH 3.

PTH 24 was designated to its current location in 1956. Prior to 1956, the route, known as PTH 27, started at PTH 10 at Tremaine and travelled west to Rapid City. From Rapid City, the highway turned north and terminated at PTH 16, then known as PTH 4, east of Basswood. The north–south section of the old PTH 27 was decommissioned and redesignated as part of PR 270 in 1966.

When PTH 24 was first added in 1956, the highway's western terminus was PTH 21 south of Hamiota, making the original length of the highway . It was extended to its current length in 1957.

Major intersections

References

External links 
Manitoba Official Map - Southwest

024